Lê Tuấn Hùng (born 1960 in Vietnam) is an Australian-Vietnamese composer, performer, and musicologist. He is a multi-instrumentalist with a strong background in Vietnamese traditional music and Western classical music. Known as a skilled performer of the đàn tranh, a Vietnamese zither, he plays traditional Vietnamese music as well as cross-cultural and experimental music.  His compositions have been created for a wide range of instruments, ensembles and media. A number of his compositions combine Vietnamese instruments with Indonesian and European Renaissance and Medieval instruments.

He holds a Bachelor of Music degree from the University of Melbourne and a Ph.D. in Music from Monash University. He is married to Dang Kim Hien (Ðặng Kim Hiền).

Bibliography

 Le, Tuan Hung. "Mindfulness of hearing : hearing places from a non-western perspective" in Hearing Places : Sound, Place, Time and Culture. Edited by Ros Bandt, Michelle Duffy and Dolly MacKinnon. Newcastle: Cambridge Scholars Publishing, 2007. 
 Le, Tuan Hung. Dan Tranh Music of Vietnam : Traditions and Innovations. Melbourne, Tokyo : Australia Asia Foundation, 1998.  (hard back);  (paperback)
 Le, Tuan Hung. "Vietnamese Traditions" in Currency Companion to Music and Dance in Australia. General editors: John Whiteoak and Aline Scott-Maxwell. Sydney: Currency House in association with Currency Press, 2003. 
 Le, Tuan Hung. "Vietnamese Music" in Oxford Companion to Australian Music. Edited by Warren Bebbington. Melbourne: Oxford University Press, 1997. 
 Le, Tuan Hung. "Popular music of Vietnam" in Music and Popular Culture: Asia and Australia : Unit Study Guide. Clayton, Vic.: Monash Open Learning, 1995.
 Le, Tuan Hung. "The Dynamics of Change in Hue and Tai Tu Music between 1890 and 1990" in Music-cultures in Contact : Convergences and Collisions. Edited by Margaret J. Kartomi and Stephen Blum. Sydney : Currency Press, 1994. 
 Le, Tuan Hung."Composition and Performing Process in Hue and Southern Chamber Music" in Nhac Viet Journal of Vietnamese Music, 1992, 1(2):43-60.
 Le, Tuan Hung."Music and Politics: A Socio-Political Interpretation of Significant Aspects of Compositions for the Zither Dan Tranh in South Vietnam since 1975" in New Perspectives on Vietnamese Music. Edited by Phong T. Nguyen. [New Haven, Ct.] : Yale Center for International and Area Studies, 1992.

Discography

Albums

Awards and nominations

ARIA Music Awards
The ARIA Music Awards is an annual awards ceremony that recognises excellence, innovation, and achievement across all genres of Australian music. They commenced in 1987.

! 
|-
| 2005
| On the Wings of a Butterfly
| ARIA Award for Best World Music Album
| 
| 
|-

References

External links
Le Tuan Hung official site

Le Tuan Hung's archived official site at Australia's National Web Archive Pandora

Listening
Audio of compositions by Le Tuan Hung, from Le Tuan Hung official site
List of nominees - Music - Entertainment - theage.com.au 14 Sep 2005 Le Tuan Hung et al - On The Wings Of A Butterfly (Move Records).

20th-century classical composers
21st-century classical composers
Australian classical composers
Australian male classical composers
Living people
1960 births
20th-century Australian male musicians
20th-century Australian musicians
21st-century Australian male musicians
21st-century Australian musicians